Slow Down or slowdown may refer to:

Music
 Slow Down (album), by Keb' Mo', 1998

Songs
 "Slow Down" (Bobby Valentino song), 2005
 "Slow Down" (Brand Nubian song), 1991
 "Slow Down" (Douwe Bob song), representing the Netherlands at Eurovision 2016
 "Slow Down" (Lacy J. Dalton song), 1982
 "Slow Down" (Larry Williams song), 1958; covered by the Beatles, 1964
 "Slow Down" (Loose Ends song), 1986
 "Slow Down" (Selena Gomez song), 2013
 "(Ha Ha) Slow Down", by Fat Joe, 2010
 "Slow Down", by the Academy Is... from Almost Here, 2005
 "Slow Down", by Alejandro Escovedo from Real Animal, 2008
 "Slow Down", by Alicia Keys from The Diary of Alicia Keys, 2003
 "Slow Down", by Aly & AJ from Into the Rush, 2005
 "Slow Down", by Blur from Leisure, 1991
 "Slow Down", by Clyde Carson, 2012
 "Slow Down", by Dimitri Vegas & Like Mike, 2018
 "Slow Down", by Dirty Heads from Super Moon, 2019
 "Slow Down", by Estelle from Lovers Rock, 2018
 "Slow Down", by Ghostface Killah from The Big Doe Rehab, 2007
 "Slow Down", by Irene Cara from Anyone Can See, 1982
 "Slow Down", by Lil Tjay from Destined 2 Win, 2021
 "Slow Down", by Nichole Nordeman from Every Mile Mattered, 2017
 "Slow Down", by Normani and Calvin Harris from Normani x Calvin Harris, 2018
 "Slow Down", by Ozzy Osbourne from Bark at the Moon, 1983
 "Slow Down", by Reel Big Fish from Monkeys for Nothin' and the Chimps for Free, 2007
 "Slow Down", by Ringo Starr from Ringo 2012, 2012
 "Slow Down", by Skip Marley with H.E.R., 2019
 "Slow Down", by Why Don't We from The Good Times and the Bad Ones, 2021
 "Slow Down", by YoungBoy Never Broke Again from The Last Slimeto, 2022
 "Slow Down (Anthem Emporium 2013)", by Showtek, 2013

Other uses
 Slowdown, an industrial action
 Slow Down (unidentified sound), a sound recorded in the Pacific Ocean
 Slowdown (venue), an entertainment venue in Omaha, Nebraska, US
 Slow Down, a 2017 book by Nichole Nordeman
 The Slowdown, a 2018–2020 podcast by Tracy K. Smith
 Parallel slowdown, in parallel computing
 West End Slowdown, an annual charity Australian rules football game in Adelaide, South Australia

See also 
 Slowdown utility, software designed to make a faster computer run slower
 Can't Slow Down (disambiguation)